Karnataka State Film Awards are the most notable and prestigious film awards given for Kannada film industry in Karnataka, India. These are considered the highest awards for Kannada language films. They are given annually by the Government of Karnataka to honor the best talent and to provide encouragement and incentive to the Kannada film industry.

The awards are decided by a committee, headed by a panel of judges. The jury usually consists of eminent personalities from the film field. The awards intend to promote films with artistic values and to encourage artists, technicians and producers. The awards are declared by the Minister for Cultural Affairs and are presented by the Chief Minister of Karnataka.

On 14 November 2016,Chief Minister of Karnataka Siddaramaiah declared that the State Government will present the Karnataka State Film Awards on 24 April, the birthday of thespian Dr. Rajkumar, every year henceforth.

List of awards

Creative awards

 First Best Film
 Second Best Film
 Third Best Film
 Fourth Best Film
 Best Social Film
 Best Children Film
 Best Regional Film
 Best Family Entertainer
 Best Debut Film of New Director
 Best Director
 Best Actor
 Best Actress
 Best Supporting Actor
 Best Supporting Actress
 Best Child Actor (Male)
 Best Child Actor (Female)
 Best Music Director
 Best Male Playback Singer
 Best Female Playback Singer
 Best Dubbing Artist (Male)
 Best Dubbing Artist (Female)

Technical awards

 Best Cinematographer
 Best Editor
 Best Lyricist
 Best Sound Recorder
 Best Art Direction
 Best Story
 Best Screenplay
 Best Dialogue

Special awards
 Lifetime Contribution to Kannada Cinema Award
 Jury's Special Award
 Best Book on Kannada Cinema
 Best Short Film

Honorary awards
 Puttanna Kanagal Award
 Dr. Rajkumar Award
 Dr. Vishnuvardhan Award

Jury

See also

 Cinema of India
 Cinema of Karnataka
 List of Kannada-language films

References

External links
 

 
Kannada cinema
Indian film awards
1966 establishments in Mysore State
Awards established in 1966